Emanuela Abbadessa (born Catania, 4 August 1964) is an Italian writer. She was the recipient of the Rapallo Carige Prize for Capo Scirocco in 2013.

Life
She graduated in Modern Literature from Catania University in 1996 where she later taught History of Music at the Faculty of Foreign Languages and Literaturesm from 2002 to 2005.

Her debut novel was Capo Scirocco (Rizzoli, 2013) which won her the Rapallo Carige Prize for Woman Writers in 2013 at the International Literary Prize of Elba Island R. Brignetti. She was also a finalist at the Alassio Centolibri Prize - An Author for Europe and the City of Rieti Literary Prize.

Works
 Catania : le istituzioni culturali municipali, Palermo : Gruppo Editoriale Kalós, 2001. 
 La via della stampa : musica per ritrovare gli anni, Catania : Museo Emilio Greco, 2002. 
 Fiammetta, Milano : Mondolibri, 2016. 
 E' da lì che viene la luce Milano : Piemme, 2019. 
 Capo Scirocco Milano : BUR Rizzoli, 2019.

References

External links
 Officialwebsite

Italian women novelists
21st-century Italian women writers
21st-century Italian novelists
Writers from Catania
1964 births
Living people